99 is a 2019 Indian Kannada-language romantic drama film directed by Preetham Gubbi and produced by Ramu. The film stars Ganesh and Bhavana. It was released on 1 May 2019. In spite of being a remake of the 2018 Tamil film 96, the film was dubbed in Tamil as 99.

Plot 
Ramachandra aka Ram is a travel photographer. He visits his high school and is overcome by memories. So, a reunion is arranged through their school WhatsApp group. At the reunion, his friends Murali, Shubha and Sathish catch up with him. Murali hesitantly mentions that Janaki aka Jaanu (Ram's childhood sweetheart) is coming from Singapore.

In 1999, Ram and Jaanu have been friends and classmates in tenth grade. Jaanu is a talented singer. Ram develops a love for Jaanu and she reciprocates. Once their board exams are over, they have a moment with each other where Jaanu asks him not to forget her until they meet again after the holidays.

Jaanu (Bhavana) arrives at the reunion and searches for Ram. When Shubha points Ram's location to her, Jaanu walks towards him. She reminisces the first day of 10th grade when she eagerly awaits Ram's arrival to the classroom, but he doesn't show up. She finds that Ram has left the school because his father had financial difficulties and his family relocated to Banglore overnight. Jaanu is inconsolable and pines for Ram until she completes school.

Ram and Jaanu finally meet and find it uncomfortable to interact with each other, but gradually get along. Their friends talk about Jaanu's married life in Singapore and disclose that Ram is still single and has not moved on. After the reunion party, both go out on a drive. Jaanu reveals how she could not forget Ram and would have traded anything just to have met him once back then. She narrates how circumstances forced her to marry someone else. Then, Ram asks Jaanu if she really does not remember the day he came to her college to meet her. Ram says that he and Murali waited in front of Jaanu's college to meet her and passed on a message through a student. Surprisingly, Jaanu refused to meet Ram and forbade him to contact her again. He returned sadly and never tried to meet her since then. Jaanu is devastated listening to this and reveals that she never saw them at her college and thought it was her stalker who was troubling her. Ram tells that except for the mistake of assuming that she hated him, he knew everything about her life. He also tells about seeing her from afar at her wedding. Jaanu is heartbroken because she felt his presence and expected him to come for her until the last minute. Both feel sad about their misfortune and finally come to terms with everything that happened in their lives. Jaanu expresses her desire to spend the final few hours with Ram before she catches the flight back home.

They go out into the city and then to a restaurant and catch up on more memories. There, they meet Ram's photography students who assume Jaanu is his wife and request her to share their story. Jaanu obliges and narrates an improvised version of the time when Ram tried to meet Jaanu at her college. She tells about how they finally met and made up and have been together ever since and got married. Ram feels awkward but tries his best to go along. The students leave and Ram and Jaanu get wet in the rain. So he asks her to visit his apartment to freshen up.

At his apartment, Jaanu is visibly upset that Ram does not have a love life and requests him to move on and get married and have a family. She finally sings Ram's favorite song for him, a song that she had purposefully avoided singing in school in spite of his repeated requests. Ram shows Jaanu a collection of their old memories like love poems, dried flowers and their school uniforms. They realize that time is running out and go back to Jaanu's hotel to get ready for her flight in a few hours. Jaanu is sad knowing that she will leave Bengaluru and Ram very soon. At the airport, Ram escorts her till the boarding gate and they bid a teary farewell. Jaanu then gets into the flight and departs.

Back at his home, Ram finds Jaanu's clothes that he had put to dry the previous night. He folds them neatly, puts them along with his treasured collection of school memories and shuts the suitcase and the screen cuts to black.

Cast 

Ganesh as Ramachandran aka Ram
Hemanth Srinivas plays the younger version
Bhavana as Janaki aka Jaanu
Samikshaa plays the younger version
Ravishankar Gowda as Murali 
Jyothi Rai as Subha
P. D. Sathish Chandra
Amrutha Ramamoorthy
Pranava Murthy
Vajrang Shetty
Prakash Thuminad
Raghu Ramanakoppa as Barber
Renuka Prasad 
Chandrahas Ullal
Jhansi M (New Horizon)

Production 
99, a remake of the Tamil film 96 (2018), is directed by C. Premkumar, this being the first remake he directed. It is produced by Ramu of Ramufilms, and has cinematography by Santhosh Rai Pathaje. Principal photography began on 17 December 2018, and was expected to conclude by late January 2019. The title 99 was chosen because of Gubbi's friendship with Ganesh which began in 1999, when they were in college. Bhavana agreed to join the film because she knew that the combination of Gubbi and Ganesh would guarantee success. The first schedule of the film was shot in Puttur.

Soundtrack 

The soundtrack is composed by Arjun Janya. This will be his 100th soundtrack. The song "Heege Doora" was released as a single on 4 March 2019.

Release 
The film was released on 1 May 2019.

Awards and nominations
Ravishankar Gowda nominated best supporting actor in 9th South Indian International Movie Awards.

References

External links 
 

2010s Kannada-language films
2019 films
2019 romantic drama films
Films directed by Preetham Gubbi
Films set in 1999
Films set in Karnataka
Films set in schools
Films shot in Karnataka
Indian nonlinear narrative films
Indian romantic drama films
Kannada remakes of Tamil films